Vajesingh Laxman Nakum (1924-1997) was a first class cricketer from India, who played for Saurashtra. He made his debut in 1945-46 season and played his last first class match in 1962-63 season.

His uncles, Amar Singh and L.Ramji represented India at test match level.

References

External links

1924 births
1997 deaths
Indian cricketers
Saurashtra cricketers
People from Rajkot